Aue is a small town in Germany at the outlet of the river Schwarzwasser into the river Zwickauer Mulde in the Ore Mountains, and has roughly 16,000 inhabitants. It was merged into the new town Aue-Bad Schlema in January 2019. Aue was the administrative seat of the former district of Aue-Schwarzenberg in Saxony, and is part of the Erzgebirgskreis since August 2008. It belongs to the Silberberg Town League (Städtebund Silberberg)

The mining town has been known for its copper, titanium, and kaolinite. The town was a machine-building and cutlery manufacturing centre in East German times and is now developing tourism, as the Silver Road (Silberstraße) runs through town. The town is also known for the football club FC Erzgebirge Aue, which is currently playing in the 3rd German division (3. Bundesliga)

Aue was until 1991 a centre of the Sowjetisch-Deutsche Aktiengesellschaft Wismut (“Soviet-German Wismut Corporation”, or SDAG Wismut).

Geography

Neighbouring communities 
Bordering communities are Bad Schlema, Bernsbach, Bockau, Zschorlau, the towns of Lauter, Lößnitz and Schneeberg in the district of Aue-Schwarzenberg as well as the town of Hartenstein in the Zwickauer Land.

Climate 

Aue's average air temperature is 8.0 °C, and the yearly precipitation is 790 mm.

History 
The town's first mention came in 1219 when it was named in a document as Bertoldus prepositus de Owa. Owa, later also Awe or Aw referred to the meadow (although Aue in German actually means “floodplain”) at the forks of the Schwarzwasser und Zwickauer Mulde, where the first settlers had their homes next to the small monastery of Zelle, founded in 1173. In 1479, tin and silver mining began, leading to an upswing in the town's fortunes. In 1526, the Auerhammer (ironworks), later called Eisenwerk and now a constituent community of Aue, had its first documentary mention.

The first St. Nicholas' Church, of which no details have been passed down, was located on the former church square, the Kirchplatz (the present Neumarkt) and must have been replaced by a new building between 1625 and 1628. On 4 August 1633 this building, together with a large part of the town, was destroyed in a raid by imperial troops. By 1636 the church had been temporarily rebuilt.

In 1627, Aue was granted market rights by Elector Johann Georg I of Saxony for a yearly market on Saint Bartholomew's Day (27 August), and in 1632 for a second, the Katharinenmarkt, on 25 November. In 1635, Veit Hans Schnorr founded the first blue dye works in Saxony in Niederpfannenstiel, now also a constituent community of Aue. From 1711 kaolin was also delivered to Meißen for preparing porcelain. Since the mid-18th century, documents have referred to Aue as a town. In 1897, Zelle was amalgamated with Aue, and Alberoda followed in 1929. Already by 1901, the royal Amt court had taken up its function in the town.

One of Saxony's oldest artworks is the painting from the east wall of the little monastery, which shows Emperor Friedrich I Barbarossa, Mary and a bishop. In the 1930s, it was removed for reasons of restoration, and is now found in the St.-Annen-Kapelle near the cathedral in Freiberg. A copy by H. Beck is found in the Friedenskirche Aue-Zelle (“Peace Church”).

During World War II, a subcamp of the Flossenbürg concentration camp was located here.

Like Schwarzenberg, the town remained unoccupied for a while after the Second World War ended in 1945.

From 1952 to 1990, Aue was part of the Bezirk Karl-Marx-Stadt of East Germany. Until 1994, the town was the administrative seat of the district of Aue. With district reform in Saxony that year, Aue became the administrative seat of the newly formed district of Aue-Schwarzenberg.

Since 1996, there has been a Silberberg Town League (Städtebund Silberberg), to which, besides Aue, also belong Schneeberg, Schwarzenberg, Bad Schlema, Lauter and Lößnitz. In November 2006 the mayors of Aue, Lößnitz, Schneeberg and Bad Schlema expressed the intention of amalgamating their respective municipalities into a united town of Silberberg.

Population development 
Development of population figures (from 1960 on 31 December):

 Source as of 1998: Statistisches Landesamt des Freistaates Sachsen
1 29 October
2 31 August

Politics

Mayors 

The following chart shows the mayors and the periods of office.

Town council 
 CDU/FDP: 7 members
 FBA/SPD: 5 members
 PDS: 5 members
 FWA: 3 members
 LdU: 2 members

Economy and infrastructure
The town has a station at the junction on the Zwickau–Schwarzenberg line and is served by Regionalbahn trains, operated by Erzgebirgsbahn (a subsidiary of Deutsche Bahn) between Zwickau and Johanngeorgenstadt.

Coat of arms 
The town's arms show two wooden bridges, one over the other, in gold on blue over a wavy silver watery surface, each bridge with two little flags on the balustrade flying left.

Famous people

Honorary citizens 
 Ernst Papst (b. 1843), factory owner, founder of the public gymnastic club and the volunteer fire brigade
 Fürst Otto von Bismarck (1815–1898), Imperial Chancellor, honorary citizen since 1 April 1895
 Gustav Hiltmann (1850–1931) joint owner of the Hiltmann & Lorenz (HILO) factory with great dedication to his homeland, town councillor honorary citizen since 1920
 Emil Teubner (1877–1958), woodcarver and sculptor
 Peter Koch, company director of Nickelhütte Aue GmbH (nickelworks)
 Alexander Bauer, former partner in the Curt Bauer KG factory

Sons and daughters of the town 
 Melchior Lotter (1470–1549), book printer and publisher
 Kurt Teubner (1903–1990), painter and graphic artist
 Ernst Hecker (1907–1983), painter, lithographer and impressionist
 Dietmar Vettermann (b. 1957), chief mayor of the city of Zwickau
 Thomas Colditz (b. 1957), CDU politician, member of the Saxony Landtag
 Max Poepel (1896–1966), town councillor and, from 1940 to early 1945, Deputy Lord Mayor. Prevented bridges being blown during US advance in World War II.

Other celebrities 

Ernst August Geitner (1783–1852), chemist, physician, botanist and inventor of German silver, founded Auerhammer German silver works in 1829, forerunner of today's Auerhammer Metallwerk GmbH thereby laying the groundwork for the town's development into a centre for German silver cutlery manufacture.
Clemens Winkler (1838–1904), German chemist, discoverer of the chemical element germanium, spent his youth in the constituent community of Niederpfannenstiel; Aue's Gymnasium is named for him.

For name origin: German placename etymology

Gallery

References

External links 

 Aue.de, town's homepage
 

 
Erzgebirgskreis
Former municipalities in Saxony